HMS Lively was a 38-gun fifth rate frigate of the Royal Navy, launched on 23 July 1804 at Woolwich Dockyard, and commissioned later that month. She was the prototype of the Lively class of 18-pounder frigates, designed by the Surveyor of the Navy, Sir William Rule. It was probably the most successful British frigate design of the Napoleonic Wars, to which fifteen more sister ships would be ordered between 1803 and 1812.

Action of 5 October 1804

In October 1804, Lively was under the command of Captain Graham Eden Hammond.
 

On 5 October, a British squadron of four frigates, Lively, Medusa,  and Amphion and, with Graham Moore as Commodore, Indefatigable, intercepted four Spanish frigates under the command of Rear-Admiral Don Joseph Bustamente, Knight of the Order of St. James, off Cadiz. As it transpired later, they were carrying bullion from Montevideo, South America to Spain. Spain was at the time a neutral country, but was showing strong signs of declaring war in alliance with Napoleonic France. Acting on Admiralty orders Moore required the Spaniards to change their course and sail for England. Admiral Bustamente refused and a short engagement ensued.

First, Mercedes blew up. Then Indefatigable captured Medée and Lively captured Clara. After a further chase, Lively and Medusa captured Fama.

Medée, the flagship, was armed with forty-two 18-pounder guns, on the main deck, and had a crew of 300 men. She lost two men killed and 10 wounded.
Fama, the Commodore's ship, was armed with thirty-six 12-pounder guns on the main deck, and had a crew of 180 men. She lost 11 killed and 50 wounded.
Clara was armed with thirty-six 12-pounder guns on the main deck, and had a crew of 300 men. She lost seven killed and 20 wounded.
Mercedes was armed with thirty-six 12-pounder guns, on the main deck, and had a crew of 280 men. After she exploded the British were only able to rescue her second captain and 40 men.

Indefatigable had no casualties. Amphion had five men wounded, one badly. Lively had two killed and four wounded. Indefatigable and Amphion escorted Medée and Fama to Plymouth. Medusa and Lively brought in Clara.

The value of the treasure was very large, and if it had been treated as Prize of War then Moore and his brother captains would have become extremely wealthy. As it was the money (and ships) were declared to be "Droits of Admiralty" on the grounds that war had not been declared, and the captains and crew shared a relatively small ex gratia payment of £160,000 for the bullion, plus the proceeds of the sale of the hull and cargo.

The Royal Navy took her into service as Santa Gertruda, but did not commission the 40-year-old ship. Instead it used her as a receiving ship at Plymouth.

In March 1805, Lively was attached to Sir James Craig's military expedition to Italy.

Fate
On 20 August 1810, while escorting another convoy to Malta, HMS Lively ran aground on rocks near Point Coura, Malta, and was wrecked; there were no deaths. Workmen from the dockyard at Valletta attempted unsuccessfully to get her off. Work continued until late September when she was abandoned as a wreck after having been stripped of anything of use or value. The court martial dis-rated the master for having sailed too close to shore, and reprimanded the officer of the watch.

Footnotes
Notes

Citations

References

Fiction
O'Brian, Patrick (2002) Post Captain. HarperCollins. .

External links 
 
Michael Phillips. Lively (38) (1804). Michael Phillips' Ships of the Old Navy. Retrieved 3 September 2008.

Frigates of the Royal Navy
Shipwrecks in the Mediterranean Sea
Maritime incidents in 1810
1804 ships